Moskowite Corner is a census-designated place in Napa County, California. The 2010 United States census reported Moskowite Corner's population was 211.

Geography
According to the United States Census Bureau, the CDP covers an area of 2.8 square miles (7.3 km), 99.84% of it land, and 0.16% of it water.

Demographics
The 2010 United States Census reported that Moskowite Corner had a population of 211. The racial makeup of Moskowite Corner was 183 (86.7%) White, 1 (0.5%) African American, 14 (6.6%) Native American, 1 (0.5%) Asian, 0 (0.0%) Pacific Islander, 8 (3.8%) from other races, and 4 (1.9%) from two or more races. Hispanic or Latino of any race were 25 persons (11.8%).

The Census reported that 211 people (100% of the population) lived in households, 0 (0%) lived in non-institutionalized group quarters, and 0 (0%) were institutionalized.

There were 86 households, out of which 21 (24.4%) had children under the age of 18 living in them, 47 (54.7%) were opposite-sex married couples living together, 4 (4.7%) had a female householder with no husband present, 5 (5.8%) had a male householder with no wife present.  There were 6 (7.0%) unmarried opposite-sex partnerships, and 0 (0%) same-sex married couples or partnerships. 20 households (23.3%) were made up of individuals, and 8 (9.3%) had someone living alone who was 65 years of age or older. The average household size was 2.45.  There were 56 families (65.1% of all households); the average family size was 2.98.

The population was spread out, with 41 people (19.4%) under the age of 18, 11 people (5.2%) aged 18 to 24, 37 people (17.5%) aged 25 to 44, 88 people (41.7%) aged 45 to 64, and 34 people (16.1%) who were 65 years of age or older.  The median age was 49.4 years. For every 100 females, there were 104.9 males.  For every 100 females age 18 and over, there were 104.8 males.

The homeowner vacancy rate was 1.3%; the rental vacancy rate was 18.2%.  189 people (89.6% of the population) lived in owner-occupied housing units and 22 people (10.4%) lived in rental housing units.

References

Census-designated places in Napa County, California
Census-designated places in California